Yakhouba Gnagna Barry (born 17 April 1998) is a Guinean footballer who plays as a forward for Horoya and the Guinea national team.

International career
Barry made his debut with the Guinea national team in a 3–0 2020 African Nations Championship qualification win over Namibia on 19 January 2021.

External links
 
 NFT Profile

References

1998 births
Living people
Sportspeople from Conakry
Guinean footballers
Guinea international footballers
Association football forwards
Santoba FC players
Horoya AC players
Guinée Championnat National players
2020 African Nations Championship players
Guinea A' international footballers